Boyxanlı (also, Bayxanlı, Bayankhanly, and Boykhanly) is a village and municipality in the Jalilabad Rayon of Azerbaijan.  It has a population of 1,302.

References 

Populated places in Jalilabad District (Azerbaijan)